Kazua  is a town and commune in the municipality of Pango-Aluquém, province of Bengo, Angola.

References

Populated places in Bengo Province
Communes in Bengo Province